Scottsburg is an unincorporated community in Douglas County, Oregon, United States. It was once a growing town but after a large flood in December 1861 the town declined. Scottsburg was named for pioneer Levi Scott.

For a short time in the 1850s and 1860s, it was a seaport servicing the interior of Southern Oregon.

Scottsburg was a transfer point for a stage line that ran from Drain, Oregon to Scottsburg. Once at Scottsburg, travelers boarded a steamboat and travelled down river to Gardiner, Oregon.

Notable people
Janet J. McCoy, High Commissioner of the Trust Territory of the Pacific Islands.

References

External links
Historic images of Scottsburg from Salem Public Library

Unincorporated communities in Douglas County, Oregon
Unincorporated communities in Oregon